David Beard may refer to:

David Beard (volleyball) (born 1973), Australian volleyball player
David Beard (Canadian football) (born 1993), Canadian football offensive lineman